Phosphoryl bromide, also known as phosphorus oxybromide, is an inorganic compound with the formula POBr3.

Preparation 
Phosphoryl bromide is prepared by the reaction between phosphorus pentabromide and phosphorus pentoxide:

3 PBr5 + P2O5 → 5 POBr3

It can also be prepared via the slow addition of liquid bromine to phosphorus tribromide at 0 °C, followed by the slow addition of water and vacuum distillation of the resulting slurry.

Structure and properties
Phosphoryl bromide forms colorless crystals or thin plates with a faint orange tint. Its crystals belong to the orthorhombic space group Pnma, with intermolecular Br–O bridges creating infinite chains within the structure. The intermolecular bonding causes distortions from the C3v symmetry found in the free molecule.

It reacts violently with water, forming phosphoric acid and hydrobromic acid. It is soluble in ether, benzene, chloroform, carbon disulfide, and concentrated sulfuric acid. It is stored in sealed glass ampoules.

References

Phosphorus oxohalides
Oxobromides